Mohammad Aminuddin (1921-1971) was a Bangladeshi lawyer, who was killed in the Bangladesh Liberation war and is considered a martyr in Bangladesh.

Early life
Aminuddin was born on 1921 in Gouripur, Lalpur, Natore District, East Bengal, British Raj. He completed his high school in Khanjanpur Mission High School in 1938 and completed his Bachelor of Arts from Rajshahi Government College in 1942. He joined as an Inspector in the Bengal Civil Supplies Department based in Kolkata. In 1950 he completed his law degree from Dhaka University and started his legal practice in Dhaka.

Career
Aminuddin moved to Pabna and joined the Pabna District Bar Association in 1952. He Joined Awami League, political party next year. He campaigned against General Ayub Khan and was imprisoned by the government. He was elected general secretary of Pabna District Bar Association in 1970. He was elected to the East Pakistan Provincial assembly in 1970 from Awami League. He was involved in the non-cooperation movement in the area and was the convener of Pabna Zilla Mukti Sangram Parishad.

Death and legacy
Aminuddin was arrested on 26 March 1971 by members of Pakistan Army from Pabna. Pakistan army executed him on 29 March 1971. Bangladesh Post Office released commemorative stamps with his pictures on 14 December 1993. In 2001 he was awarded the Independence Day Award by the government of Bangladesh in 2001. He was a founder of Pabna Law college, which was renamed to Shaheed Aminuddin Law College after him.

References

Recipients of the Independence Day Award
1921 births
1971 deaths
20th-century Pakistani lawyers
People from Natore District
University of Dhaka alumni
Rajshahi College alumni
People killed in the Bangladesh Liberation War